The Canadian Gold Maple Leaf (GML) is a gold bullion coin that is issued annually by the Government of Canada. It is produced by the Royal Canadian Mint.

The Gold Maple Leaf is legal tender with a face value of 50 Canadian dollars. The market value of the metal varies, depending on the spot price of gold. Having a .9999 millesimal fineness (24 carats), in some cases .99999, the coin is among the purest official bullion coins worldwide. The standard version has a weight of minimum 1 troy ounce (31.10 grams).

The Gold Maple Leaf's obverse and reverse display, respectively, the profile of Queen Elizabeth II of Canada and the Canadian Maple Leaf. In 2013 and 2015, new security features were introduced. In 2013, a laser-micro-engraved textured maple leaf was added on a small area of the reverse (Maple Leaf) side of the coin. In the centre of this mark is the numeral denoting the coin's year of issue, which is only visible under magnification. In 2015, the radial lines on the coin's background on both sides of the coin were added.

On 3 May 2007, the Royal Canadian Mint unveiled a Gold Maple Leaf coin with a nominal face value of $1 million and a metal value of over $3.5 million. On 26 March 2017, one of the six pieces was stolen from the Berlin Bode Museum; it has not been found as of 2021. It is assumed that it has been melted down for the gold.

Information
The coin was introduced in 1979. At the time the only competing bullion coins being minted were the Krugerrand (which was not widely available because of the economic boycott of apartheid-era South Africa) and the Austrian 100 Corona. Coins minted between 1979 and 1982 have a fineness of .999.

Gold Maple Leaf

For .99999 ("Five Nines") Pure Gold Maple Leafs, see Special issues below.

The .9999 1982 Gold Maple Leafs began minting in November. Thus, most of the 1982 Gold Maple Leafs are .999 fine.

Production problems
Some dealers have complained about the production quality of the Gold Maples. The softness of 24 karat gold combined with the Gold Maples' milled edge, clear field around the Queen and the tube storage supplied, means that the coins easily show handling marks. This is a standard problem with pure gold.

Bimetallic Maple Leaf
As a way of commemorating 25 years as an industry leader in bullion coins, the Royal Canadian Mint created a unique six-coin set. mint.ca It was a new bimetallic maple leaf, set in bullion finish (a brilliant relief against a parallel lined background). The six-coin set was the first to include the  Maple Leaf denomination. Each coin included a double-date of 1979–2004, and the  coin featured a commemorative privy mark. All coins were packaged in a black leather presentation case with a black velour insert, along with a certificate of authenticity. Mintage: 839 sets.

Other Details

Special issues

99.999% Gold Maple Leaf
The gold Maple Leaf coin was .999 pure until 1982, when its purity was raised to .9999. Some coins are issued at a purity of .99999; this standard does not replace the Mint's .9999 Gold Maple Leaf coins, but is instead reserved for special editions.

Coloured Gold Maple Leaf

Hologram Gold Maple Leaf

Olympic Maple Leaf
The Royal Canadian Mint and the International Olympic Committee have reached an agreement on Olympic Gold and Silver Maple Leaf coins. The announcement was made on August 3, 2007, and the agreement allows the RCM to strike bullion coins with the emblems of the 2010 winter Olympic and Paralympic Games. The issue will consist of two coins – one Gold Maple Leaf coin and a Canadian Silver Maple Leaf coin; both coins feature the date of 2008. The new agreement means that the RCM is now selling Olympic coins through all of its major business lines – bullion, circulation and numismatics.

Individual releases

Privy-marked GML

Maple Leaf Privy M7

Other fractional GML

Definition of finishes
Bullion Brilliant relief against a parallel lined background.
Proof Frosted relief against a mirror background
Specimen Brilliant relief on a satin background.

See also
American Buffalo (coin)
American Gold Eagle
Britannia (coin)
Bullion
Canadian Silver Maple Leaf
Canadian Platinum Maple Leaf
Canadian Palladium Maple Leaf
Gold as an investment

References

External links
 Official website of the Royal Canadian Mint
 Monarchy - Royal Canadian Mint
 Maple Leafs Get New Packaging 
 Royal Canadian Mint Act

Gold Maple Leaf
Gold bullion coins